The Life and Times of Eddie Roberts (a.k.a. L.A.T.E.R.) is an American syndicated television sitcom about a college professor and his family. It was intended to be a spoof of soap operas in the same style as Soap and Mary Hartman, Mary Hartman, but it failed to get the ratings that the other two shows had; it was canceled after 65 episodes, which had been broadcast five days a week over three months in 1980.

Cast and characters
Renny Temple as Eddie Roberts, a professor at Cranepool University
Udana Power as Dolores Roberts, Eddie's wife, who's an aspiring major league baseball player
Allison Balson as Chrissy Roberts, Eddie's daughter
Stephen Parr as Tony Cranepool, a faculty colleague
Joan Hotchkis as Lydia
Allen Case as Dean Knitzer

Episode list

References

External links

The Life and Times of Eddie Roberts at CVTA

1980 American television series debuts
1980 American television series endings
1980s American sitcoms
English-language television shows
First-run syndicated television programs in the United States
Television series by Sony Pictures Television